Hakim Bashi-ye Hoseynabad (also Romanized as Ḩakīm Bāshī-ye Ḩoseynābād) is a village in Anarestan Rural District, Chenar Shahijan District, Kazerun County, Fars Province, Iran. At the 2006 census, its population was 723, in 159 families.

References 

Populated places in Chenar Shahijan County